Theremyn 4 is a live electronic Peruvian group founded in 1999 by musician and producer Jose Gallo. Theremyn_4 has various full-length albums, numerous local and international appearances and international awards. They have been considered by the Peruvian and foreign critic as one of the most important electronic music groups from their country. Their sound travels through different styles of electronic music, merging with rock, new wave, jazz and world music.

Among their main musical influences are New Order, Kraftwerk, Orbital, Led Zeppelin, Narcosis, Rush, The Chemical Brothers and Boom Boom Satellites. In interviews they also mention other influences such as film, painting, comics and literature.

Theremyn_4's current lineup features Jose Gallo on synths, drums, samplers and djing.

First albums (1999-2003)
"Fluorescente Verde en el Patio" ("Fluorescent Green in the Yard") was independently released in July 2000 and among the scene, CDs and cassettes were dispersed. The album's style is close to breakbeat and drum & bass, with experimental incursions. Hakim de Merv, a Peruvian critic, referred to the release of this album as "the birth of non-trance Peruvian dance electronica." "Chambi," one of the many outstanding songs this album has to offer, pays homage to the famous Peruvian photographer, Martin Chambi. "SDF-18 bit groove," another great song, samples and recreates the theme song from the animated series, Robotech. The video produced for the song "Carmín Ciclón," was broadcast on MTV in 2001. Meanwhile, the song "Detonador" was considered one of the 10 most downloaded songs in February 2000 on the website, "www.yeyeye.com," owned by Soda Stereo's ex-drummer, Charly Alberti.

2001 saw the release of "Mi Vida en Infrarrojo" ("My Life in Infrared"), an album highlighting six hours of music Theremyn_4 presented at "Modular 12 º 06 's / 77 °01' or "Park-O-Bahn." The installation "Park-O-Bahn" transmitted 168 hours of continuous Peruvian electronic music. It was held in April of the same year in Miraflores Central Park, Lima. "Mi vida en infrarrojo," is an album with a "spatial" influence, mixed with down-tempo electronica, lounge and trip-hop. During that same year, the group had its first live performance with Jose Gallo on keyboards, effects and samplers and Francisco "Chisco" Ramos on guitar.

In 2002 the group appeared at the compilations "Tributo a la Niñez." Then, in 2003 the group participated in Contrataque's compilation “Tributo al Rock Subterraneo" and performed at the Peruvian electronic music festival “Looperactiva”.

Flight Simulator (2004-2005)
The 3rd album "Lima/Tokyo/Lima" was debuted at the "Peru Moderno Festival" in Paris, France, in February 2004, organized by Cultural Association, CAPULI. Once the group arrived back to Lima, they added audiovisual formats. Renzo Signori was in charge of Live Visuals and Jose Gallo of the musical area. They presented the album in many of Lima's venues and in different cities in Peru, such as: Cajamarca, Chiclayo and Trujillo. Notable reviews appeared in various national and international presses. Latin America Rolling Stone Magazine, reviewed "Lima / Tokyo / Lima" as Theremyn_4's best album yet, and was "strongly recommended." "El Comercio," a well-known newspaper in Peru, said, "Theremyn_4 has become the most important group of the local, electronic scene." The sound of "Lima/Tokyo/Lima" is more mature than previous albums and has bits of rock, jazz and experimental tones. Music from films and future jazz pop music, such as the Japanese anime "Cowboy Bebop" influence Theremyn_4's then sound.

In June 2004, Theremyn_4 released "Peruvian Remixing Co," which was produced almost simultaneously with "Lima/Tokyo/Lima." "Peruvian Remixing Co." is a mixed album and one of the first of its kind in Peru. This album contains remixed Peruvian rock and electronic groups such as: Catervas, Gaia, Zen and Sonica. Theremyn_4 mixed previous work from numerous, inspirational groups with their own previous and unreleased tracks.

In the beginning of 2005, "Lima/Tokyo/Lima" was listed as "The Best of 2004,” according to a number of Peruvian media sources. "2001 Mil Años Despues," an electronic music radio show, conducted by the legendary DJ Helene Ramos, said "Lima / Tokyo / Lima" was the best album, had the best album cover and song of the year, entitled "Panasonic Jazz Suite," in her annual review.

Re-evolution (2006-2007)
In 2005, the group began performing with major, foreign groups. In June, they played with Aviador Dro, perhaps the most important Spanish electronic group. In December, Theremyn_4 played with the Argentinian electro pop band Entre Ríos. At the same time, the group continued with their national tour in Peru, around Cuzco, Trujillo and La Oroya. After the tour, in September 2006, the group released their 5th album,"Spacetimebomb." This was the first time Theremyn_4 collaborated with other Peruvian musicians and Argentinian musician, Gabriel Lucena (an ex-member of Entre Rios). The Peruvian musicians involved were: Paco Holguin (Emergency Blanket), Carlos Vasquez (Unidad Central), Bruno Macher (Sabor y Control) and Jason Fashe. The sound of this album shows how Theremyn_4 was able to step away from breakbeats and jazz, and step into acid house and techno. Tracks like "Rocknho," "El Futuro Buda," "Lo-fi gen" and "Supercontexto," are all proof of this transition. The idea for the visual imagery for the album was based on the graphic novel entitled, "The Invisibles," by Scottish writer, Grant Morrison.

“Spacetimebomb” was performed at the "Fuga Jurasica 9 Festival," in Buenos Aires, Argentina. The album was presented at the "Mario Vargas Llosa Theater," in Lima's National Library with French electro funk band, SMOOTH.

In October 2006, Theremyn_4 participated in a Peruvian tribute to Soda Stereo, with their own rendition of "Secuencia Inicial," from the album DYNAMO.

In December 2006, Theremyn_4 released their video for "Escape en un Simulador de Vuelo," directed by the award-winning video director, Percy Céspedez. The video was broadcast on MTV, was chosen to be part of a video-art exhibit in Europe and was selected to be shown at the Contemporary Art Festival in Barcelona, in 2007. In Lima, Theremyn_4 appeared on the TV show, "Jammin," playing the best of "Spacetimebomb" live.

In June 2007, Theremyn_4 performed as a support act for Robin Guthrie (guitarist for Cocteau Twins) at a notable concert in Lima.

Raid on the Dancefloor (2008-2010)
In April 2008, DJ and producer, Nicolas Miranda, joined the group and the performances were taken to the dance floor. Due to the new remixes and versions that were created, "Inflamable" was created in mid-2009. "Inflamable" is an album with a techno, electro, hard sound. Theremyn_4 used samples of old songs to create a new sound concept. New collaborators, such as Wicho Garcia, (Mar de Copas and Narcosis) sang an electronic version of "La Vida Actual," a song from underground Peruvian legends "Narcosis" and Cocó Ciëlo from the band Silvania and Ciëlo. "Inflamable" appeared clearly defined throughout the local media and blogs worldwide. The song "Milnueve84," was chosen for the Music Alliance Pact selection, in April 2010.

Theremyn_4 began to perform at dance oriented venues and at electronic music festivals. In August 2009, they were invited to be part of "The Hacienda World Tour," and shared the stage with techno legend, Peter Hook, (New Order bassist, Joy Division) in Lima. In November, they performed on the main stage at Creamfields festival in Lima, along with Richie Hawtin, Etienne de Crecy and other well-known, international electronic artists.

In September 2009, "ESPACIOTIEMPO CIRCULAR" was released, containing video and audio, giving listeners and viewers an experience through music and pictures telling the history of Theremyn_4 and their ten years of spreading music.

In August 2010, the song "Supercontexto" was selected for the CD "DOSSIER CIUDAD Y CULTURA (X): LIMA (PERÚ)" from the Spanish magazine, Zona de Obras. The article in the magazine stated that "all albums that have been released by Theremyn_4 are essential pieces to understand the evolution of local electronic music."

In January 2010, Theremyn_4 performed at Intifest, an important electronic music festival with full Peruvian concepts.

In August 2010, Theremyn_4 performed in Colombia, at the independent music festival, "Cucunuba Pop Fest," along with indie bands from around Latin America.

In November 2010, the group opened a show in Lima for RECOIL, the personal project by former Depeche Mode member, Alan Wilder.

Rhythm and Fiction (2011-2012)
In November 2011, "Fiction Beats," Theremyn_4's seventh album was released. Produced between 2010 and 2011, this album has a more polished and mainstream sound than ever before. "Fiction Beats," influenced by new wave, rock, techno and world music, has songs with pop formats, without losing its "dance" roots. It was mixed in Buenos Aires by Gabriel Lucena. The list of artists who participated in the creation of this album is very extensive. Musicians who appear on this album are: Solange Jacobs (Ex-Tonka and now Fifteen Years Old), Paco Holguin (Emergency Blanket), Lu Falen (Blind Dancers), Santiago Pillado (El Hombre Misterioso), and from the production stance: Chisco Ramos (guitarist and member of the group from 2001 to 2003), Nicolas Miranda (DJ, producer and member of the group from 2008 to 2010), Jason Fashe (producer from Audiokoncept Records, Lima) and Jorge Azama (Live Sound Engineer).

Upon Theremyn_4's release of "Fiction Beats," they quickly rose to the top spot on local lists, as "Best of the Year." Blogs, newspapers and magazines praised the album's "dance and pop" impetus. Raul Cachay, an El Comercio critic, wrote: "Truly fresh, vigorous and a real party starter virtually from start to finish".

In March 2012, "Fiction Beats" reached New York, USA. "Fiat Lux," a dance-pop track from "Fiction Beats," received a Grand Prize from the "John Lennon Songwriting Contest," in the electronic music category, and later received a Lennon Award in June as the "Electronic Exponent of the Year." In July, Theremyn_4 were invited to the Pop Montreal Festival in Canada, among the best new pop groups from around the globe. In Peru, they were selected from some of the most talented groups in the country, to play at the "Lima Live Rock" concert, the largest Peruvian festival in recent years. In December the group was nominated for one of the most important awards from the aspect of cultural life in Peru, the "Premios Luces," for "Group of the Year."

Waves or particles? (2012-2015) 

To perform "Fiction Beats" live, Jose Mendocilla (guitar) and Lu Falen (vocals) join the group. With this line-up, Theremyn_4 composes as a band the album "The Next Wave" (2014). In March 2013 they played at the Canadian Music Fest in Toronto 23 which have within his headliners artists as Nick Cave, Metric, Rihanna, Chvrches. The same year they won the Vox Pop Best Electronica / Dance Album (Fiction Beats) at the 12th Independent Music Awards  and the 3rd Place at the International Songwriting Competition in the Electronica / Dance category with the song "Urban Daemon". In April 2014 the Australian band Cut Copy choose them to open their show in Lima. They were part of the  "Colors Night Lights" festival  that have headliners like Placebo, Pixies and Julian Casablancas. In June they performed at the MICSUR showcases 2014  at Mar del Plata (Argentina) and also play at Buenos Aires. In October they receive the Electrosono Award for "Live act of the year". The same month they open the 30 Seconds to Mars show in Lima. "The Next Wave" is positioned among the best works of the year. In the early 2015 the song "Dance till the love is gone" reaches the semifinals of the UK Songwriting Contest. All the group discography is officially distributed on all digital platforms.

Lost memories (2017-2018) 

After a recess and a change in the musical approach, Jose dedicates the year 2017 to edit a compilation of unfinished remixes called "Lost Data". Remixes of Resplandor, The Voiders, Bocanegra, Huelga de Hambre, Orgatronics (UK) as well as a version of "Tomorrow Never Knows" with Wicho Garcia (ex-Narcosis). Parallel to this goes the work what would become Theremyn_4's 9th album. In the early 2018 he made various remixes for Peruvian and Colombian bands. Theremyn_4 also appears on tribute albums to pioneer electronic acts from South America (Silvania from Peru and elSigno from Argentina). Finally in September "Lost Moments" the 9th studio album is released. In this album, Theremyn_4 "mixes in its own terms, pop structures and pop elements with introspective and experimental soundscapes.”  Paco Holguin (Emergency Blanket), Diego Larrañaga (Huelga de Hambre), Ana González (Brina Quoya) participate as guests musicians.

Discography

Albums
 2000 - Fluorescente verde en el patio
 2001 - Mi vida en infrarrojo
 2004 - Lima/Tokyo/Lima
 2004 - Peruvian remixing Co.
 2006 - Spacetimebomb
 2009 - Inflamable
 2011 - Fiction beats
 2014 - The Next Wave
 2018 - Lost Moments

Compilation albums
 2002 - Caleta Finale
 2002 - Tributo a la niñez
 2003 - Contrataque: Tributo al rock subterraneo
 2006 - Tributo Peruano a Soda Stereo
 2008 - Zona de Obras: Dossier ciudad y cultura: LIMA (PERÚ)
 2008 - Varios Artistas: Dos Más (Dorog records)
 2014 - Toma tu Hype! Vol.1 (Hype records)

Videos
 2001 - Carmin Ciclon
 2006 - Escape en un simulador de vuelo
 2009 - Espaciotiempo Circular 1999-2009
 2003 - Fiction Beats Experience
 2014 - Airport Blues (lyric video)
 2015 - The Next Wave (end titles take)
 2016 - Dance till the love is gone
 2018 - Walking with you

References

External links
 Official website
 Theremyn_4 on Facebook
 Theremyn_4 Spotify profile
 Theremyn_4 Official Blog
 Theremyn_4 on Instagram

Peruvian musical groups